Hulchul (English: Chaos) is a 1995 Indian Hindi-language action drama film directed and written by Anees Bazmee. It stars Vinod Khanna, Ajay Devgn, Amrish Puri and Kajol in the lead roles while Ronit Roy.

Plot

Deva (Ajay Devgn) has been raised by ACP Siddhant (Vinod Khanna) and his wife Pushpa (Navni Parihar). Karan (Ronit Roy) is their biological son who often feels jealous of his mother's attention to Deva. Deva is a loving and responsible son while Karan is a constant source of stress for his parents due to his reckless lifestyle. Shobraj (Amrish Puri) is a rich and powerful businessman whose son is arrested by ACP Siddhant on charges of rape and murder. Shobraj tries to bribe Siddhant into releasing his son but fails.

In the meantime, Karan is arrested on charges of murdering his girlfriend. Pushpa is heart broken at the thought of losing her son. Deva vows to prove Karan's innocence for the sake of his foster mother. Shobraj approaches Siddhant again and promises to save Karan if Siddhant rescinds his testimony against his son. Siddhant refuses his offer and Shobraj's son is sentenced to death. Deva, with the help of his girlfriend Sharmili (Kajol), discovers that Karan's girlfriend was actually murdered by Rocky. It is revealed that Shobraj had paid Rocky to frame Karan for the murder. Deva catches Rocky and takes him to the police station. However, Shobraj has Rocky murdered before the latter can make his statement in front of a judge. In the meantime, a higher court rejects the appeal of Shobraj's son and the latter is executed. Shobraj vows to kill Siddhant's entire family to avenge the death of his son. He kidnaps Karan and Pushpa and tells Siddhant to come and meet him. Deva goes to rescue Puspha while Siddhant goes to meet Shobraj. A fight ensues in which Shobraj and his men are killed and Karan, Puspha, Deva, and Siddhant are reunited.

Cast

Production 
Kajol met Ajay Devgn on the sets of this film.

Soundtrack

References

External links
 

1990s Hindi-language films
Indian action films
1995 films
1995 action films
1995 directorial debut films
Films scored by Anu Malik
Films directed by Anees Bazmee